Janez Semrajc (born 24 July 1989) is a Slovenian professional tennis player who currently competes on the ITF Men's Circuit. In June 2014, he achieved a career-high singles world ranking no. 262. He has played for the Slovenia Davis Cup team.

See also

Slovenia Davis Cup team

References

External links

1989 births
Living people
Slovenian male tennis players
Sportspeople from Ljubljana